The Mestský štadión is a multi-purpose stadium in Lučenec, Slovakia, currently used mostly for football matches. It is the home ground of  MŠK Novohrad Lučenec and holds a capacity of 5,000 people.

The stadium was damaged during the 2010 Central European floods.

References 

Football venues in Slovakia
Buildings and structures in Banská Bystrica Region